Dwiragaman is a Bengali television serial aired on Zee Bangla since 2014. It aired every Monday to Saturdays. The series starred Bijoylakshmi Chatterjee in the lead role, who made her debut in the soap Sansaar Sukher Hoy Romonir Guney.

Plot 
The soap is about a newlywed couple, Michri and Sayan and Sayan's 5 sisters. The story revolves around the relationship between Michri and her 5 sisters-in-law.

Cast
 Bijaylakshmi Chatterjee / Kaushambi Chakraborty as Michri 
 Vicky Dev / Raja Ghosh as  Saran Sarkar aka Bhuto
 Tapas Paul as Abhishek Chowdhury / Narayan Mitra
 Sabyasachi Chakrabarty as Jayanta Basu
 Pushpita Mukherjee as Sharbani Sarkar Basu
 Sudip Sarkar as young Jayanta (flashback)
 Debjani Deb as young Sharbani (flashback)
 Lily Chakraborty as Shona Dimma
 Indrakshi Nag / Rumi Dutta as Shibani Sarkar Chowdhury
 Prity Biswas as Ishani Sarkar Chowdhury
 Riya Roy as  Laboni Sarkar
 Bulbuli Panja as  Shraboni Sarkar
 Namita Chakraborty as Shibani's Mother In Law
 Animesh Bhadury as Aman Chowdhury
 Chhanda Chatterjee as Bhuto's Grandmother
 Mimi Dutta as Mitul
 Rajib Banerjee as Niladri Chowdhury
 Joyjit Banerjee as Arjun Mallick
 Suchandra Banerjee as Madhura Chowdhury
 Suranjana Roy as Neha Chowdhury
 Ishani Sengupta as Ranjabati Mukherjee aka Ranja
 Dhrubajyoti Sarkar as Kushal

References

External links 
 Dwiragaman at ZEE5
 

Zee Bangla original programming
2014 Indian television series debuts